Romanivka may refer to the following places in the Ukraine:

 Romanivka, Bereznehuvate settlement hromada, Bashtanka Raion, Mykolaiv Oblast
 Romanivka, Terebovlia Raion
 Romanivka, Ternopil Raion

See also
Romanovka